Fernando Nicolás González Ureta (born 4 July 1995) is a Uruguayan footballer who plays as a forward. He is currently a free agent.

Career
González's first club was Uruguayan Segunda División side Rocha. He made his professional debut on 14 September 2014 in the league against Deportivo Maldonado, prior to scoring his first goal in his fifth game for the club in October versus Miramar Misiones. Overall, he scored two goals in twenty matches in 2014–15 as Rocha finished 14th. Rocha were relegated in 2015–16, a season which González featured just twice, to the 2017 Segunda División B.

Career statistics
.

References

External links

1995 births
Living people
Footballers from Montevideo
Uruguayan footballers
Association football midfielders
Uruguayan Segunda División players
Rocha F.C. players